

Erick-Oskar Hansen (27 May 1889 – 18 March 1967) was a German general in the Wehrmacht during World War II. He was a recipient of the Knight's Cross of the Iron Cross of Nazi Germany.

Biography
Born in Hamburg, Hansen entered the army of Imperial Germany in 1907 as a Fahnenjunker (officer cadet) in the 9th Dragoons. He was given command of the 4th Infantry Division in 1938. Promoted to generalleutnant in August 1939, he led the division through the invasion of Poland and the French Campaign before it was withdrawn from the front in August 1940 for conversion to armour. Now designated the 14th Panzer Division, Hansen oversaw its initial training in armoured warfare.

Hansen was promoted to General der Kavallerie (General of the Cavalry) before taking command of LIV Army Corps in 1941, operating on the Eastern Front. Soon afterwards, on 4 September 1941, he was awarded the Knight's Cross of the Iron Cross. In 1943, he commanded the German Military Mission in Romania in addition to being Military Commander, Romania. He surrendered to the Red Army troops in the course of the Soviet Jassy–Kishinev Offensive in August 1944. He was held in the Soviet Union until 1955. On his return to Germany, he lived in Hamburg.

Notes
Footnotes

Citations

References

 

1889 births
1967 deaths
Military personnel from Hamburg
German Army generals of World War II
Generals of Cavalry (Wehrmacht)
German Army personnel of World War I
Recipients of the clasp to the Iron Cross, 1st class
Recipients of the Gold German Cross
Recipients of the Knight's Cross of the Iron Cross
Recipients of the Order of Michael the Brave, 2nd class
German prisoners of war in World War II held by the Soviet Union